The Home Review was a Swedish women's magazine, published from 1859 to 1885. It was the first women's magazine in the Nordic countries and its inception is sometimes regarded as the foundation of Sweden's women's movement.

History 
The Home Review was founded by Sophie Adlersparre and Rosalie Olivecrona in Stockholm in 1859. It treated issues within women's rights and gender equality such as women's education, property rights, and legal status. Aside from this, the magazine also contained novels, serials, and popular science. It also featured poems and short stories. In 1886, the magazine was replaced by Dagny, the paper of the Fredrika Bremer Association. Dagny was renamed Hertha in 1914 after Fredrika Bremer's novel by the same name.

References

Citations

Bibliography 
 .
 .
 .

External links
Editions of Home Review 1859–1885 digitized by Gothenburg University Library

1859 establishments in Sweden
1859 in women's history
1885 disestablishments in Sweden
Defunct literary magazines published in Europe
Defunct magazines published in Sweden
Feminism in Sweden
Feminist magazines
First-wave feminism
Literary magazines published in Sweden
Magazines established in 1859
Magazines disestablished in 1885
Magazines published in Stockholm
Swedish-language magazines
Weekly magazines published in Sweden
Women's magazines published in Sweden